Vando Baifas Félix (born 3 September 2002) is a Bissau-Guinean profesional footballer who plays as a forward for Portuguese club Sporting CP B.

Career statistics

Club

References

2002 births
Living people
Bissau-Guinean footballers
Bissau-Guinean expatriate footballers
Association football forwards
Liga Portugal 2 players
Leixões S.C. players
Bissau-Guinean expatriate sportspeople in Portugal
Expatriate footballers in Portugal